is a national highway in Japan connecting Setagaya, Tokyo and Hodogaya-ku, Yokohama, with a total length of .

List of interchanges and features

Daisan Keihin Road

It is managed by the East Nippon Expressway Company. In addition to its designation as National Route 466, the Daisan Keihin Road is signed as a part of E83 under the "2016 Proposal for Realization of Expressway Numbering".

Route description
The toll road has three lanes traveling in each direction along the entire  route. The speed limit is set at 80 km/h along most of the toll road, the only exceptions to this limit is at the termini of the route where the limit is set at 60 km/h.

Tolls
In short, the tolls average at a cost of 50 to 100 yen per exit. To drive the entire route costs ¥390 for standard-sized cars.

References

National highways in Japan
Roads in Kanagawa Prefecture
Roads in Tokyo